Thomas Cornelius Mangold (born 20 August 1934) is a British broadcaster, journalist and author. For 26 years he was an investigative journalist with the BBC Panorama current affairs television programme.

Personal life
Tom Mangold was born in Hamburg and came to Britain as a Jewish child refugee from the Nazis. The original family name was Goldman but this was changed as a result of antisemitism. He attended Dorking County Grammar School. He did National Service with the Royal Artillery. He is married, lives in London, has three daughters by previous marriages, and works as a freelance reporter specialising in intelligence and travel.

Journalism
Mangold was a reporter with the Sunday Mirror and then the Daily Express.  After spending nearly two years investigating the Profumo affair, he joined BBC TV News in 1964 to be a war correspondent covering conflicts in Aden, Vietnam, Nigeria, Northern Ireland, the Middle East and Afghanistan. In 1971 he moved to BBC TV Current Affairs working first for 24 Hours, then Midweek, becoming involved in some of the first investigative news documentaries of the BBC.

In 1976 Mangold transferred to Panorama, still concentrating on investigative journalism and making over 100 documentaries in 26 years. In 1993 he won both the Business / Consumer Investigative Reports category in the CableACE Award in and also the Royal Television Society's Journalism Award. These were followed in 1996 by the bronze award in the Best Investigative Report Category at the New York Television Festival and in 1999 he won Investigative Reporting / News Documentary category in the Chicago International Television Competition.

Between 2004 and 2008 Mangold helped Mayfield, Kentucky resident Susan Galbreath investigate and solve the case of the murder of Jessica Currin, which had occurred in 2000 but remained unsolved until 2008. Galbreath had contacted Mangold after seeing some of his Panorama programmes on local cable TV.

Mangold has been described in The Times as "the doyen of broadcasting reporters."

Books and film

In 1996 Mangold did research for the BBC / HBO drama-documentary Hostile Waters, about the loss of a Russian submarine.

Mangold has written or co-written five books
The File on the Tsar (with Anthony Summers), 1976 
The Tunnels of Cu Chi (with John Penycate), 1985 
Cold Warrior: James Jesus Angleton: The CIA's Master Spy Hunter, 1991 
Plague Wars (with Jeff Goldberg), 1999 
Splashed! A Life from Print to Panorama, 2016

References

External links
Tom Mangold personal website

1934 births
Living people
English male journalists
English writers
German emigrants to England
Panorama (British TV programme)
People educated at Dorking Grammar School
Royal Artillery soldiers
People of German-Jewish descent